The 1989 Amstel Gold Race was the 24th edition of the annual road bicycle race "Amstel Gold Race", held on Sunday April 22, 1989, in the Dutch province of Limburg. The race stretched 242 kilometres, with the start in Heerlen and the finish in Meerssen. There were a total of 162 competitors, with 108 cyclists finishing the race.

Result

External links
Results

Amstel Gold Race
April 1989 sports events in Europe
1989 in road cycling
1989 in Dutch sport
1989 UCI Road World Cup